At the beginning of the Second World War, Australia did not have an extensive manufacturing industry. Furthermore, it was only partially independent from the United Kingdom (Britain). Therefore, most of Australian weapons and equipment during war was imported from either Britain or USA, although many were replaced with locally produced versions later in war.

Knives and bayonet

Bayonets 

 Pattern 1907 bayonet

Small arms

Pistols (manual and semi-automatic)
 Enfield No. 2 Mk I
 Webley Mk IV revolver
 Browning Hi-Power P35
 Smith & Wesson Victory
 Beaumont-Adams revolver  (Volunteer Defence Corps)
 Webley M1872 Bull Dog  (Volunteer Defence Corps)
 Colt Model 1851 Navy  (Volunteer Defence Corps)
 Smith & Wesson No.3  (Volunteer Defence Corps)

Automatic pistols and submachine guns
 Owen Gun
 STEN submachine gun
 Thompson submachine gun
 Austen submachine gun

Rifles
 Lee-Enfield No. 1 Mk III* 
 Lee-Enfield No. 4 Mk I
 Lee-Enfield No. 5 Mk I Jungle Carbine
 Pattern P1914 No. 3 Mk I
 Charlton Automatic Rifle
 Lee-Metford Mk II (Volunteer Defence Corps)
 Martini-Henry Mk IV (Volunteer Defence Corps)

Grenades and grenade launchers
 Mills bomb No. 36M

Recoilless rifles

Flamethrowers
Flamethrower, Portable, No 2

Machine guns

Infantry and dual-purpose machine guns

 Vickers Mk I machine gun
 Lewis Mk I light machine gun
 Bren Mk 2 light machine gun
 Hotchkiss M1909 Mk I Benét–Mercié light machine gun  
 Browning M1919A4 machine gun

Vehicle and aircraft machine guns

 M2 Browning machine gun
 Lewis Mk III gun
 Besa machine gun

Artillery

Infantry mortars
 Stokes mortar
 Ordnance SBML 2-inch mortar
 Ordnance ML 3 inch Mortar
 Ordnance ML 4.2 inch Mortar

Heavy mortars & rocket launchers

Field artillery
 Ordnance QF 15-pounder Mk I
 Ordnance QF 13-pounder
 Ordnance QF 18-pounder Mk2, Mk4
 Ordnance BLC 15-pounder
 RML 2.5 inch Mountain Gun
 QF 3.7-inch mountain howitzer
 QF 4.5-inch howitzer
 QF 5.25 inch gun
 BL 10-pounder Mountain Gun
 Ordnance QF 25-pounder
 Ordnance QF 25-pounder Short

Fortress and siege guns
 BL 60-pounder gun
 BL 4 inch naval gun Mk 1
 BL 4.5-inch Medium Field Gun
 BL 4.7 inch /45 naval gun
 BL 5.5-inch Medium Gun
 BL 6-inch 26 cwt howitzer
 BL 6-inch 30 cwt howitzer

Anti-tank guns
 Ordnance QF 2-pounder Mk IX/X
 Ordnance QF 6-pounder Mk II
 Ordnance QF 17-pounder

Anti-tank weapons (besides anti-tank guns)
 Boys anti-tank rifle Mk I, Mk II
 PIAT

Anti-aircraft weapons

Light anti-aircraft guns
 Vickers QF 2-pounder naval gun  (pom-pom)
 Rolls-Royce QF 2-pounder naval gun
 QF 3-pounder Hotchkiss
 Oerlikon 20 mm cannon
 Vickers 6-Ton
 Bofors 40 mm gun

Heavy anti-aircraft guns
 QF 6-pounder 6 cwt Hotchkiss
 QF 6 pounder 10 cwt gun
 QF 12 pounder 12 cwt naval gun
 QF 12-pounder 12 cwt AA gun
 QF 13-pounder 6 cwt AA gun
 QF 3-inch 20 cwt
 QF 3.7-inch AA gun
 QF 4 inch Mk V naval gun
 QF 4 inch Mk XVI naval gun
 QF 4.5-inch Mk I – V naval gun

Vehicles

Tankettes
CTLS-4TAC

Tanks
 Sentinel tank (only Australian production)
 Fiat M11/39
 Fiat M13/40
 Vickers Light Tank Mk VI
 Renault R35
 M3 Stuart
 Medium tank M3 Grant
 Matilda II
 Yeramba

Tank-based

Other

Armored cars
 Dingo (scout car)
 Rhino Heavy Armoured Car
 Rover Light Armoured Car
 S1 Scout Car
 T17E1 Staghound armoured car

Armored carriers
 Universal Carrier

Engineering and command

Trucks
Canadian Military Pattern truck Ford F30 (by Ford Australia)

Passenger cars

Motorcycles
Harley Davidson 42 WLA    http://www.theliberator.be/liberator8.htm

BSA WM20

Tractors & prime movers

Miscellaneous vehicles
 Landing Vehicle Tracked

Navy ships and war vessels
List of ships of the Second World War

Aircraft
 de Havilland Mosquito
 Bristol Beaufort
 Bristol Beaufighter
 CAC Woomera (CA-4/CA-11)
 CAC Wirraway (CA-3)
 CAC Wackett (CA-6)
 CAC Boomerang (CA-12)
 North American P-51 Mustang (license built as CA-17 Mustang)
 de Havilland Express

Secret weapons

Radars

Missiles & bombs

Cartridges and shells

See also
List of military equipment of Australia

References

 
 
Australian Army World War II